Monoblock PC is a computer workstation based on the Elbrus 2000 architecture. It was developed in Russia as a joint effort between Kraftway and the Moscow Center of SPARC Technologies (MCST).

Specifications
 Based on the Monokub motherboard with one Elbrus-2C+ processor at 500 MHz
 Heat pipe-based cooling system
 20" touchscreen with 1600x900 resolution
 SATA 2.5" hard drive, with room for one extra drive
 DVD-RW drive
 Wi-Fi using adapter
 USB hub with card reader and panel audio header
 2 built-in 4 W loudspeakers
 Connector for external power supply 19 V, 8 A

Operating system
 Elbrus operating system based on the Linux 2.6.33 kernel
 Elbrus 2000 reportedly also runs Microsoft Windows

References

Personal computers